Felix O'Day is a lost  1920 silent film directed by Robert Thornby and starring H. B. Warner. The film was released through Pathé Exchange. It is based on a novel of the same name.

Cast
H. B. Warner - Felix O'Day
Marguerite Snow - Lady Barbara O'Day
Lillian Rich - Annette Borney
Ray Ripley - Austin Bennett
Karl Formes - Jules Borney
George B. Williams -

References

External links

 Felix O'Day at IMDb.com

lantern slide(archived)

1920 films
Lost American films
Pathé Exchange films
Films directed by Robert Thornby
Films based on American novels
American silent feature films
American black-and-white films
1920s American films
Silent American drama films